Ion Ferenz (10 June 1932 – 2 October 2003) was a Romanian ice hockey player. He competed in the men's tournament at the 1964 Winter Olympics.

References

External links
 

1932 births
2003 deaths
Ice hockey players at the 1964 Winter Olympics
Olympic ice hockey players of Romania
Sportspeople from Miercurea Ciuc